Admas University  is a tertiary institution based in Addis Ababa, Ethiopia. It was established in 1998.

Overview
The Admas University is accredited by Regional Educational Bureaus, Higher Education Relevance and Quality Agency (HERQA), and the Federal Ministry of Education of Ethiopia. It offers both on-campus education and distance learning in various programs. These courses are in turn offered at a number of levels: certificate, diploma and degree.

The University has also started many e-Learning programs to develop the Ethiopian Higher Educational System. To reach these goals, it is currently working in partnership with internationally renowned institutions, such as Cisco and the University of Lübeck in Germany.

Admas has additional branches in Hargeisa and Garowe, situated in the autonomous Somaliland and Puntland regions of Somalia, respectively.

References

External links
Admas University homepage (in )
oncampus GmBH Cooperation Partners (in )
CISCO Country Transformation - Ethiopia
Admas University , Hargeisa homepage (in )
Higher Education Relevance and Quality Agency (HERQA)(in )

Universities and colleges in Ethiopia
Educational institutions established in 1998
1998 establishments in Ethiopia